The Discovery is a comedy by Frances Sheridan. The play premiered on 5 February, 1763, at the Drury Lane Theatre, London. The actors being David Garrick, Frances' husband Thomas Sheridan, William O'Brien, Charles Holland, Mrs. Hannah Pritchard, Mary Ann Yates, and Jane Pope. Garrick agreed that Thomas Sheridan should play the lead role and be paid with two night's profits.

Aldous Huxley controversially rewrote the play and provided a new ending, for a Chatto and Windus edition in 1924.

References

1763 plays
Comedy plays
Irish plays
British plays
West End plays